Sandbanks Provincial Park is a provincial park located on Lake Ontario in Prince Edward County near Picton, Ontario, Canada. The park is considered one of the best sandy beaches in Ontario and contains the largest bay-mouth barrier dune formation in the world. The  park was established in 1970 and operates year round. Birdwatching, camping, cycling, fishing, and swimming are among the activities available in the park.

Description
The park measures  in size. It is noted for its picturesque sand dunes and beaches and contains the largest bay-mouth barrier dune system in the world. This formation is created by longshore currents flowing from west to east along Lake Ontario's northern shore. The dunes run from Lake Ontario into West Lake. Behind the barrier dunes lies a series of foredunes that is sparsely vegetated and further back, pannes, back dunes, and reforested sand ridges.

County Road 12 in Prince Edward County, stretching from The Outlet, Ontario to Bloomfield, Ontario, runs through the park.

Flora and fauna
Plants native to the sand dunes include sea rocket, American beachgrass, tall wormwood, Russian thistle, sand cherry. In the pannes, sedge and rushes are the most common, along with orchids, purple gerardia, Kalm's lobelia, silverweed and twayblades. In the forested areas, creeping juniper, white cedar, eastern hemlock, sugar maple, balsam fir, white spruce and three types of pine tree are common. Prairie species are also found within the park, such as hoary puccoon, sand dropseed, and butterflyweed.

Animals found within the park include a number of shorebird and amphibian species, along with largemouth and smallmouth bass, yellow pickerel, northern pike among other fish.

History
The dunes were formed by glaciers 12,500 years ago. 
In the 1880s, due to a combination of timber cutting and poor farming practices, the soil inland from the sand dunes had become destabilized and the sand dunes were able to drift inland, increasing in size. In 1881, the West Point Road was buried under  of sand and the town of Athol, Ontario was forced to relocate after facing a similar event. In the 1920s, Sandbanks was the site of an intense reforestation project. The sand dunes extended over a further . To recreate the Carolinian forest that had pre-existed there, the reforestation project used poplar to prevent the sand dunes from burying roads and orchards.

Development of Sandbanks Provincial Park began in the 1960s. A development plan submitted in February 1964 placed a paved road through the sand dunes. After protests due to the damage that would cause to the dunes, the plan was abandoned and Parks Ontario pledged to protect the dunes. The park was established in 1970.

Recreational use
Sandbanks Provincial Park is one of the most popular parks in Ontario, commonly reaching capacity by 10 am. The park is operated by the government of Ontario, with areas for different types of recreation. With 3 beaches (Outlet Beach, Dunes Beach and Lakeshore Beach) and over 600 campsites. Sandbanks offers both non-electrical and electrical campsites located all over the park. Some parts of the beach had been bought or settled before the designation of the area as a provincial park, which makes the beaches come in short clusters along the coastline. Naturists have used the beaches for nude bathing for many years. Other activities include walking, cycling, birdwatching, fishing and swimming.

Park information
There are two radio stations for travelers at the main entrance to the park.

89.5 FM (English)
91.9 FM (French)

In media
Sandbanks stands in for Sable Island in the 2002 made-for-television film Touching Wild Horses, starring Jane Seymour. Resident Evil: Afterlife (2010) was also filmed there. This is also where the music video for the 1985 song "Wave Babies" by Honeymoon Suite was filmed. Sandbanks was filmed for Leg 7 pit stop for season 8 of The Amazing Race Canada.

Citations

References

External links
 
 Friends of Sandbanks Provincial Park

Provincial parks of Ontario
Parks in Prince Edward County, Ontario
Shoals of Canada
Protected areas established in 1970
1970 establishments in Ontario
Nude beaches